Harnek Singh is an Indian athlete. He is known as Subedar Harnek Singh Brar. He is Living in Kot Sukhia Village Faridkot, Punjab, India.

Early life 
He was born in 1935. He served in the Indian Army.

Career 
He joined Athletics in the Army and won a Gold Medal in Edenberg and medals in England, Scotland, Germany, Singapore, Hong Kong and in Thailand. After winning the Gold Medal he earned Arjuna Award in 1969.

References

1935 births
Living people
Indian Army personnel
Indian male long-distance runners
Athletes (track and field) at the 1970 British Commonwealth Games
Recipients of the Arjuna Award
Commonwealth Games competitors for India